The 2004–05 NBA season was the Jazz's 31st season in the National Basketball Association. During the offseason, the Jazz signed free agents Carlos Boozer and Mehmet Okur. The Jazz got off to a strong start winning six of their first seven games, but would struggle later on, losing 12 of their 15 games in December. Their struggles continued as they lost nine straight games in March. The Jazz finished last place in the Northwest Division with a 26–56 record, and failed to qualify for the playoffs for the second straight season. It broke a record sequence of nineteen consecutive winning seasons by the Jazz, a feat which in major professional sports leagues of North America has been bettered only by the NFL's Dallas Cowboys between 1966 and 1985, by the NHL's Detroit Red Wings since 1990–91 and by the American League's New York Yankees between 1926 and 1964. In fact, it was the Jazz’ first losing season since 1982–83, which would place them second only to the mid-century Yankees.

For the season, the Jazz changed their logo and uniforms, adding dark blue to their color scheme. Both the logo and uniforms lasted until 2010.

Draft picks

Roster

Regular season

Season standings

Record vs. opponents

Game log

Player statistics

Awards and records
 Andrei Kirilenko, NBA All-Defensive Second Team

Transactions

References

Utah Jazz seasons
Utah
Utah
Utah